This is a list of members of the Oireachtas (National Parliament of Ireland) who served a prison sentence or were interned since 1923 in any jurisdiction before, during or after their time as a Teachta Dála (TD) or Senator.

See also
List of members of the Oireachtas imprisoned during the Irish revolutionary period (1916–23)
Records of members of the Oireachtas

References

Lists of political office-holders in Ireland
 
 
Imprisoned